Rob Dow (born September 7, 1981) is a Canadian soccer coach and a former soccer player. He is the head coach of the Vermont Catamounts men's soccer team; a position he has held since 2017.

Dow has also coached for the University of Maine, Mayville State University, Dean College, and Southern New Hampshire University.

He is a graduate of UMaine, and earned his master's degree at North Dakota State University.

Head coaching record

References

External links
 Biography at uvmathletics.com

1981 births
Living people
Association footballers not categorized by position
Canadian soccer coaches
Maine Black Bears men's soccer players
North Dakota State University alumni
Soccer people from Nova Scotia
Southern New Hampshire Penmen men's soccer coaches
University of Maine alumni
Vermont Catamounts men's soccer coaches
Association football players not categorized by nationality